Naan Mahaan Alla is a 2010 Indian Tamil-language action film written and directed by Suseenthiran. It stars Karthi, Kajal Aggarwal, Jayaprakash and Soori. Featuring music scored by Yuvan Shankar Raja and cinematography handled by R. Madhi, the film was produced by K. E. Gnanavelraja and distributed by Dayanidhi Azhagiri's Cloud Nine Movies. Set in Chennai, the film follows Jeeva, an unemployed and carefree young man whose father becomes the target of a gang of young criminals after witnessing a kidnapping.

The film, not related to the 1984 film of the same name and based on a real-life incident, released on 20 August 2011 to positive reviews, with critics praising the performances, action sequences and realistic tone. The acclaimed climax fight sequence would later go on to become the benchmark for the makers of Karthi's 2019 action film Kaithi.

Plot
Jeeva is a Chennai-based youngster who hails from a middle-class family. His father, Pragasam, is a call taxi driver and the family's sole breadwinner. Jeeva meets a woman named Priya at their friend's wedding, and soon they fall for each other. Upon meeting Priya's father, Jeeva is asked to get a job first in order to get married. Jeeva accepts, taking the job as a Bank manager but soon gets fired. Pragasam, who had witnessed a killing of two youngsters by a group of 5 young men, gets attacked by them, where he is admitted to the hospital. The gang tries to kill him again in the absence of Jeeva, but to no avail. Pragasam is brought home, and Jeeva starts taking responsibility for his family by reclaiming his lost job and maintaining all the accounts. 

Looking at the news reports of the girl that boarded his taxi and got mutilated by the gang, Pragasam calls Jeeva to accompany him to the morgue, where he helps the investigating officer by providing clues about the killer. Sensing trouble, the gang enlists the help of Pey Babu, one of the member's uncle, to plan and kill Pragasam after explaining how they killed the girl and her lover. When Pragasam and Jeeva go out to shop for the latter's sister's wedding, one of the men calls Jeeva on behalf of a store, thus separating him from Pragasam. The men then create a stampede by throwing bottles as one of them stabs Pragasam with a piece of poisoned glass sharp. Pragasam instantly dies in Jeeva's arms. Following his cremation, Jeeva tells the cops not to pursue the killers anymore as it would bring nothing but trouble for his middle-class family. 

However, Jeeva decides to take the law into his hands, fearing the gang might commit more inhumane crimes if they are scot-free. He recalls one of the men, during his father's death, looked the same as Pragasam described him during his visit to the morgue. Jeeva enlists the help of his friend Kutti Nadesan, a gangster to track down the gang. With his influence, Kutti Nadesan asks his gang to bring all the guys who plan for a murder in Chennai, so that Jeeva can identify him. While Jeeva is busy identifying the killers, Pey Babu leaves upon being questioned by Nadesan. Jeeva realizes Pey Babu was the man who delivered pamphlets at his home before Pragasam's murder. A chase ensues, and Jeeva succeeds in capturing Pey Babu after a brief fight. He orders him to call the boys and tell them to stay in front of their college. 

Jeeva succeeds in capturing his father's killer and tries to escape, but the gang gets alerted and ends up freeing their friend from Jeeva's custody following a glass bottle attack. One of the gang members stabs Pey Babu to his death. Jeeva chases the attacker near a railway line where the two brutally fight, resulting in the attacker getting run over by a train. Jeeva visits the deceased gang member's funeral to catch his friends, who escape before Jeeva sees them. They go to the beach, and Nadesan is also there along with his henchmen. The gang gets drunk and vows to kill Jeeva, who contacts Nadesan to find out about the four remaining boys. However, noticing the boys yelling, Nadesan asks for specifics and confirms the gang's location at the beach. While trying to confront the gang, Nadesan and his henchmen are lured into a trap where they are all eliminated one-by-one before Jeeva arrives. A brutal fight ensues, leaving the gang members fatally wounded. Jeeva throws them into a pit and departs after burying all of them.

Cast

 Karthi as Jeeva Pragasam
 Kajal Aggarwal as Priya, Jeeva's love interest
 Jayaprakash as Pragasam, Jeeva's father
 Soori as Ravi, Jeeva's best friend
 Vijay Sethupathi as Ganesh, Jeeva's friend
 Lakshmi Ramakrishnan as Jeeva's mother
 Ravi Prakash as Sudharsan
 Neelima Rani as Sudha
 Misha Ghoshal as Priya's friend
 Ramachandran Durairaj as Pei Babu
 Aruldoss as Kutti Nadesan
 Vinod Kishan
 Hari Vairavan
 Rajeevan
 Priya Atlee as Keerthi Pragasam, Jeeva's Sister
 Sindhu as Saroja, Kutti Nadesan's wife
 Thanjai Mahendran as Dhanam

Production

Development
After his first feature film Vennila Kabadi Kuzhu, released in February 2009, became a success, receiving much critical acclaim as well, director Suseenthiran started to work on the script for his next film. Initially planning to do one titled Azhagarsamiyin Kudhirai, which failed to commence due to financial problems, he decided to first direct a film featuring a known lead actor, before coming back to that film. He was ready with the script by August 2009, revealing details about the project. While his previous work was based on sporting incidents in a rural background, this one was said to be a "total city subject", shot entirely in Chennai. An action family entertainer, it would deal about problems in city life, according to Suseenthiran. On 19 August 2009, it was announced that the film was titled Naan Mahaan Alla and would be produced by K. E. Gnanavelraja under the banner of Studio Green, who earlier had produced Suriya's Sillunu Oru Kadhal and the award-winning Paruthiveeran by Ameer Sultan, which incidentally also starred Karthi in the lead role. It was reportedly based on a real-life incident that happened to one of the relatives of director Suseenthiran. He scripted the film for five months.

Casting
While Vennila Kabadi Kuzhu (Suseenthiran's first feature film) starred mostly newcomers, he chose Karthi for the lead role in this film as he felt that Karthi has an "innocence in his face" that was needed for this role and that he could "convey charm, innocence and being jolly at the same time". For the lead female role, Kajal Aggarwal, who had appeared in Tamil films like Pazhani, Saroja and Modhi Vilayadu, was roped in. Suseenthiran chose her after seeing her performances in the Telugu films Chandamama and Magadheera. He felt that her "cute expressions" were what he needed for that character. While Karthi's character is a middle-class bank employee, Aggarwal would play an employee in a mobile phone company.

Soori, who also played a comedic role in Vennila Kabadi Kuzhu was again included, while Jayaprakash, who played several supporting roles and rose to fame with his performance in Pasanga was chosen to play Karthi's father. As in his previous film, Suseenthiran introduced several new artists, such as five boys who played the villains with one of them being Vinod who played the younger character of Surya in Nandha. According to the director, he found three of them "loitering on a popular road in the city", whilst cinematographer Vijay Milton's assistant Ramachandran Durairaj and cinematographer Aruldoss debuted and played pivotal roles.

Filming
Filming began, after ten days of rehearsals, on 4 September 2009 and was held in cities as Chennai, Hyderabad and Visakhapatnam. In mid-September, reported locations included East Coast Road (ECR) near Chennai and later in the environs of the highways near Poonamallee in Chennai.

Soundtrack

The soundtrack of Naan Mahaan Alla is composed by Yuvan Shankar Raja, making this his third collaboration with Karthi, after scoring highly successful results with Paruthiveeran (2007) and Paiyaa (2010), and his first with director Suseenthiran, who worked with V. Selvaganesh for his previous film. The soundtrack album, which features five songs, with lyrics penned by Na. Muthukumar and Yugabharathi was released on 24 July 2010 at Sathyam Cinemas in Chennai. The song "Va Va Nilava Pudichi" is repeated at the end of the album, with singer Rahul Nambiar credited for both. Nambiar, however, stated on his Facebook site that two versions were recorded featuring his and Haricharan's voice, respectively, but that both songs in the album were rendered by Haricharan only and his own version wasn't included at all.

Only three songs were used in the film in their entirety, with "Oru Maalai Neram" being left out completely. The album received extremely positive reviews, with "Iragai Pole" in particular, sung by composer Yuvan Shankar Raja, becoming hugely popular, topping the charts for several weeks. Before the soundtrack release, Yuvan claimed on Twitter that the song was one of his favorites, on which he had worked for days. After seeing the entire film, he was said to have remixed and completely reworked that song, altering the orchestration inter alia, to match it with the visuals. He garnered accolades for the film's score as well. As per Suseenthiran, the music was "crucial" in the second half of the film, which was the reason for opting for Yuvan Shankar. According to Karthi, Yuvan had worked for 12 days for the score of the second half, which has "hardly any dialogues", adding that he was the one "who narrates the story in the second half through his music".

Release

Reception
Naan Mahaan Alla received positive reviews from both critics and audiences, with Top10Cinema.com labelling Naan Mahaan Alla as "outstanding", proceeding to highlight that "almost everything works: the plot and screenplay, performances, technical panoramas", while Pavithra Srinivasan of Rediff.com described it as "almost perfect", giving it 3 out of 5. Sreedhar Pillai of Sify.com also gave a very positive verdict, stating that director Suseenthiran comes up with a "rocker of a film" that is "refreshingly fresh, innovative and packaged in a breezy manner within the commercial format", adding that it is "engrossing and racy". Furthermore, he praised lead actor Karthi's "power packed" performance, citing that he "nails the character to perfection" and "carries the film to its winning point". Similarly Times of India reviewer Bhama Devi Ravi, gave 3.5 out of 5, claiming the film to be "entertaining almost till the end", whilst addressing high praise to both Suseenthiran, who according to her is "turning out to be a treasure", and Karthi, whose performance she described as his "best work yet".

Box office
The film opened well, and made a steady progress in the Chennai box office, eventually becoming a very successful venture. In five weeks Naan Mahaan Alla made a collection of  5 crore; 4.47 crore was collected in Chennai city alone.

Accolades

References

External links
 
 
 

2010 films
2010 action films
2010 thriller films
2010s Tamil-language films
2010 action drama films
2010 action thriller films
2010 crime action films
2010s vigilante films
Indian action drama films
Indian action thriller films
Indian crime action films
Indian vigilante films
Indian films about revenge
Indian films based on actual events
Action films based on actual events
Crime films based on actual events
Drama films based on actual events
Thriller films based on actual events
Films about murder
Films set in Chennai
Films directed by Suseenthiran
Films shot in Andhra Pradesh
Films scored by Yuvan Shankar Raja
Films shot in Chennai